Pepa y Pepe is a Spanish sitcom television series with costumbrista themes, starring Tito Valverde, Verónica Forqué, María Adánez and Silvia Abascal. It aired in 1995 on TVE1.

Premise 
The series consists of the comedic portrayal of the daily problems endured by a working-class family. The family is formed by Pepa (Verónica Forqué), Pepe (Tito Valverde), María (María Adánez), Clarita (Silvia Abascal) and Jorge (Carlos Vilches). Besides the working-class background, it also differentiated from other popular Spanish sitcoms at the time such as Farmacia de guardia or Médico de familia due to its somewhat more irreverent sense of humour.

Cast 
Main
 Verónica Forqué as Pepa, the mother of the family, a caring person.
 Tito Valverde as Pepe, the father of the family, worker in a factory of folkloric dolls and a wimp.
 Isabel Ordaz as Julia, Pepa's longtime friend.
 María Adánez as María, the eldest daughter of the family, who dreams about becoming an actress.
 Silvia Abascal as Clarita, the second daughter of the family, sarcastic and sensible teenager.
 Carlos Vilches as Jorge, the youngest member of the family.
Other (including guest roles)
 Juan Echanove as Francis.
 Roberto Enríquez as Pol.
 Miqui Puig as Charly.
 Santiago Segura as Alberto.
 Jorge Sanz.
 Ángel de Andrés.
 Pilar Bardem.
 Gracia Olayo.
 Antonio Resines.
 Santiago Ramos.
 Miriam Díaz-Aroca.
 Clara Sanchís.

Production and release 
Pepa y Pepe was loosely inspired by the American sitcom Roseanne. Produced by Bombón Helado, the series was directed by Manuel Iborra and Manuel Armán. The opening credits featured a version of the popular pasodoble "Suspiros de España", by Antonio Álvarez Alonso. The first episode premiered on 10 January 1995. The broadcasting run consisted of two seasons, featuring, respectively, 20 and 14 episodes. The last episode aired on 26 December 1995.

The series obtained great audience ratings, breaking the 7 million viewer mark, and obtaining a peak share of 40.1%, as well as it also brought forward the acting careers of María Adánez and Silvia Abascal.

References

External links 
 Pepa y Pepe on RTVE Play

1995 Spanish television series debuts
Spanish television sitcoms
1995 Spanish television series endings
1990s Spanish comedy television series
La 1 (Spanish TV channel) network series
1990s sitcoms